Alain Gomis (born 6 March 1972) is a French-Senegalese film director and screenwriter. His 2017 film Félicité was selected as the Senegalese entry for the Best Foreign Language Film at the 90th Academy Awards, making the December shortlist.

Selected filmography
 Tourbillons (1999) (Short)
 As a Man (2001)
 Petite Lumière (2003) (Short)
 Andalucia (2007)
 Today (2012)
 Félicité (2017)

References

External links

1972 births
Living people
French film directors
French screenwriters
Senegalese film directors
Senegalese screenwriters
Place of birth missing (living people)